Dinera carinifrons is a species of fly in the family Tachinidae. It is found in Europe and Asia.

Distribution and habitat
This species has a transpalaearctic distribution and it is present in most of Europe (northwards to Scotland) and in Asia (Mongolia). It especially occurs in high altitudes of the Alps.

Description
In these rather large flies, the thorax, abdomen, and legs are black with a dense microtrichosity and relatively broader frons and parafacial. Abdomen shows a light tessellate appearance, with syntergite 1+2 excavated, 3+3 dorsocentral setae present and undeveloped costal seta. This species is very similar to Dinera fuscata.

References

Belshaw R. 1993. Tachinid flies. Diptera: Tachinidae. In: Handbooks for the Identification of British Insects. Royal Entomological Society of London
Cerretti P. 2010. I tachinidi della fauna Italia-na (Diptera Tachinidae), con chiave interattiva dei generi ovest-paleartici, vol. I. Centro Nazionale Biodiversitá Forestale, Cierre Edizioni
Zhang C-T, Shima H. 2006. A systematic study of the genus Dinera Robineau-Desvoidy from the Palaearctic and Oriental Regions (Diptera: Tachinidae). Zootaxa 1243: 1–60

Dexiinae
Diptera of Europe
Diptera of Asia
Insects described in 1817
Taxa named by Carl Fredrik Fallén